Scott Scissons (born October 29, 1971 in Saskatoon, Saskatchewan) is a Canadian former professional ice hockey player. He was drafted in the first round, sixth overall, by the New York Islanders in the 1990 NHL Entry Draft. While a high percentage of players selected in the first round of that draft went on to productive National Hockey League (NHL) careers, Scissons was one of the few busts, playing just two regular season NHL games (none of the other top eight picks in the 1990 draft played fewer than 909 games in the NHL) and one playoff game, going scoreless in all.

Scissons was chosen ahead of many players who went on to long NHL careers, including: Darryl Sydor, Derian Hatcher, Peter Bondra, Doug Weight and Keith Tkachuk, and Martin Brodeur.

During his three seasons in the Western Hockey League with the Saskatoon Blades, Scissons made an impact, scoring 30 goals and 56 assists in his rookie season, plus 40 goals in his sophomore one, to climb up on the scout rankings for the 1990 draft. However, soon the injuries that would mar his career would manifest. At 18, Scissons went through a discectomy, and a wrist injury would follow, ailments that would cut him spots at Team Canada for two straight World Junior Ice Hockey Championships. Scissons made his NHL debut with the Islanders, appearing in one game at the end of the 1990–91 season. He then spent the 1991–92 season playing with the Canadian National Hockey Team, and during a game with the Montreal Canadiens injured his shoulder in a check by John LeClair. However, he was not chosen to represent Canada at the 1992 Winter Olympics.

Scissons spent the 1992–93 season playing with the Islanders' American Hockey League affiliate, the Capital District Islanders. He did, however, appear in one game with the Islanders during the 1993 Stanley Cup playoffs. He appeared in one more game with them during the 1993–94 season, and spent the remainder of the year with the Salt Lake Golden Eagles of the International Hockey League. He then played 30 IHL games in the 1994–95 season with the Minnesota Moose and Denver Grizzlies. In 1995, Scissons tried out for the Dallas Stars, but a pessimistic assessment by the team doctor lead into an early retirement at the age of 22. He returned to Saskatoon, got his certificate in commerce, and  started working on his family business, Western Mobile Homes. Scissons also played sporadically with the Saskatoon Old Pros and coached his son's hockey teams. His younger brother Jeff was also a hockey player, taken 172nd in the 1996 NHL Entry Draft by the Vancouver Canucks, but never made it to the major league.

Career statistics

References

External links
 

1971 births
Living people
Canadian expatriate ice hockey players in the United States
Canadian ice hockey centres
Capital District Islanders players
Denver Grizzlies players
Ice hockey people from Saskatchewan
National Hockey League first-round draft picks
New York Islanders draft picks
New York Islanders players
Salt Lake Golden Eagles (IHL) players
Saskatoon Blades players
Sportspeople from Saskatoon